One Day is a 2011 romantic drama film directed by Lone Scherfig from a screenplay by David Nicholls, based on Nicholls' 2009 novel of the same name. It stars Anne Hathaway and Jim Sturgess, with Patricia Clarkson, Ken Stott and Romola Garai in supporting roles. It was released in the United States on 19 August 2011 by Focus Features and in the United Kingdom on 24 August 2011 by Universal Pictures.

Plot
The film follows Dexter Mayhew and Emma Morley on the same day—15 July, St. Swithin's day—over 20 years. On 15 July 1988, after their graduation from the University of Edinburgh, Dexter and Emma spend a platonic night together and agree to “just be friends”.

One year later, Dexter helps Emma move to London to become a writer. Finding little success by 1990, she ends up a waitress in a Mexican restaurant, where she meets Ian, an aspiring comedian. Meanwhile, Dexter travels the world, staying in touch. He visits her on 15 July 1991 and suggests they take a holiday. They go to France in 1992; despite their mutual attraction, Emma turns down Dexter's advances. By 1993, Dexter is a successful television presenter with a raucous late-night show.

Dexter visits his parents on 15 July 1994 after his mother is diagnosed with terminal cancer. He arrives still under the influence from a night of heavy partying, infuriating his father. His mother is unimpressed with his wild lifestyle, and tells him he is not yet a nice person. That night, Emma goes on a date with Ian; despite their lack of chemistry, they begin a relationship.

By 1995, Emma is a school teacher and lives with Ian, but is increasingly irritated by his laziness. Dexter's new show makes him "the most annoying man on telly". Meeting Emma for dinner on 15 July 1996, Dexter gets high on cocaine, flirts with another woman, and insults Emma. She storms off and, deciding that they have outgrown each other, tells him that although she loves him, she no longer likes him.

Two years later, Dexter loses his television career, and by 1999, is in a serious relationship with Sylvie. Meanwhile, Emma has split up with Ian; he confronts her over their breakup and his jealousy of Dexter after reading her diary. Before leaving, he praises the stories in her diary and urges her to have them published. On 15 July 2000, Emma and Dexter attend the wedding of mutual friends. Dexter receives a job offer from Calum, his old roommate who has since become a multimillionaire. Emma tells Dexter she has received a book deal, and he reveals that he and Sylvie are to be married, as he will soon be a father. Dexter and Emma rekindle their friendship.

By 2001, Dexter is a devoted father to his daughter Jasmine, unaware Sylvie is having an affair with Calum, and Emma's book is published. Two years pass and Dexter, divorced, visits Emma, now a successful author living in Paris. Hopeful after a previous drunken tryst with Emma following his divorce, Dexter learns she has a new French boyfriend, and departs. Emma has second thoughts and chases after Dexter. They share a passionate kiss, and finally begin a relationship together.

Emma and Dexter are engaged by 2004 and eventually marry. Dexter opens a café in England, sharing custody of Jasmine, and he and Emma try, unsuccessfully, to have a child. On 15 July 2006, Emma is hit by a truck whilst riding her bicycle, and dies. Inconsolable, Dexter returns to his self-destructive habits. Over the years, he is comforted by Sylvie, by Jasmine, his widowed father, and even Ian, now happily married with children, who visits Dexter and tells him that Emma "lit up" around him, assuring him that "she made you decent… and you made her so happy".

On 15 July 2011, Dexter visits Arthur's Seat in Edinburgh with Jasmine. The film flashes back to 1988: after their night together, Dexter declines Emma's invitation to spend the day with her, but changes his mind. They climb Arthur's Seat and at the top, he suggests that instead of being casual friends, they “finish what they started” the previous night. Racing back to the flat, they encounter Dexter's parents on the street. Emma leaves, and Dexter tells his parents she is just a friend, but chases after her to ask for her number. They kiss passionately, and promise to see each other again.

Cast

 Anne Hathaway as Emma Morley
 Jim Sturgess as Dexter Mayhew
 Romola Garai as Sylvie Cope
 Rafe Spall as Ian, Emma's comedian boyfriend
 Ken Stott as Steven, Dexter's father
 Patricia Clarkson as Alison, Dexter's mother
 Jodie Whittaker as Tilly, Emma's university friend
 Tom Mison as Callum, Dexter's university friend
 Jamie Sives as Mr. Jamie Hazeel
 Toby Regbo as Samuel Cope, Sylvie's brother
 Georgia King as Suki Meadows, girlfriend of Dexter
 Matt Berry as Aaron
 Matthew Beard as Murray Cope, Sylvie's brother
 Heida Reed as Ingrid
 Amanda Fairbank Hynes as Tara

Production
The film is a co-production between Random House Films and Focus Features. Film4 Productions is co-financing.

Actress Anne Hathaway said she was clandestinely given the script as the film was set in the United Kingdom and director Scherfig was not looking for any American actresses for the part. Hathaway flew to London for a meeting with Scherfig to explain why she should get the part. Hathaway later said it was "the worst meeting of my life... I was just inarticulate", but on leaving Hathaway wrote out a list of songs for Scherfig to listen to, saying, "I clearly didn't communicate to you what I needed to today. But I think these songs can do it for me." Scherfig did listen to them, which led to Hathaway getting the part.

Principal photography commenced in July 2010. Filming took place on location in Scotland, England and France. The production filmed in Edinburgh, the city where Dexter and Emma first meet, in August 2010. Various landmark locations, including Arthur's Seat, were used. Production then moved to London. Parliament Hill Lido in north London was used for scenes in which Emma, of varying ages, swims. Filming took place inside a house in Granville Road in Stroud Green for scenes involving Jim Sturgess and Romola Garai. Scenes in the shop and cafe were filmed at Leila's shop and cafe on Arnold Circus, close to Brick Lane in the East End. UK railway Station filming took place at Ridgmont Station on the Bedford to Bletchley Marston Vale Line. Filming in France took place in Dinan and Dinard, near Saint-Malo, in Brittany. A seaside club was turned into the Café Paradis, designed to ape Greek themes.

Critical reception
On Rotten Tomatoes the film has a 36% approval rating based on 145 reviews, with an average rating of 5.1/10. The site's consensus states: "Despite some fresh narrative twists, One Day lacks the emotion, depth, or insight of its bestselling source material". On Metacritic, it has a score of 48% based on reviews from 41 critics, indicating "mixed or average reviews". CinemaScore polls reported that the average grade moviegoers gave the film was a "B−" on an A+ to F scale.

Betsey Sharkey of the Los Angeles Times called it a "heartbreaking disappointment of a film" while Peter Howell of the Toronto Star said "Long before the credits roll, you may find yourself wishing your life could flash before your eyes, to end the monotony of this relentless turning of calendar pages." In contrast, Roger Ebert gave the film three stars out of four, saying, "One Day has style, freshness, and witty bantering dialogue." Anne Hathaway's Yorkshire accent in the role of Emma has been widely regarded as subpar. Newspaper columnist Suzanne Moore, reviewing the film on BBC Radio 4's Front Row, said the accents were "all over the shop". Moore went on to say, "Sometimes she's from Scotland, sometimes she's from New York, you just can't tell".

Soundtrack

See also
 Same Time, Next Year (1978)

References

External links
 
 

2011 films
2011 romantic drama films
American romantic drama films
British romantic drama films
Film4 Productions films
Films based on British novels
Films directed by Lone Scherfig
Films scored by Rachel Portman
Films set in 1988
Films set in 1989
Films set in 1990
Films set in 1991
Films set in 1993
Films set in 1994
Films set in 1995
Films set in 1996
Films set in 1998
Films set in 1999
Films set in 2000
Films set in 2001
Films set in 2003
Films set in 2004
Films set in 2005
Films set in 2006
Films set in 2007
Films set in 2009
Films set in 2011
Films set in Edinburgh
Films set in London
Films set in Paris
Films shot at Pinewood Studios
Films shot in Edinburgh
Films shot in London
Films shot in Paris
Films with screenplays by David Nicholls
Focus Features films
Universal Pictures films
2010s English-language films
2010s American films
2010s British films